Dance with Me is the third album by American singer Debelah Morgan. It was released by DAS Entertainment and Atlantic Records on August 15, 2000 in the United States. Morgan collaborated with brother Giloh on production and songwriting credits on Dance with Me. The album was preceded by its title track which became a worldwide top ten hit.

Critical reception

AllMusic editor MacKenzie Wilson called Dance with Me "a fresh, quick-stepping dance-oriented album [with] a simple urban spin on R&B grooves and sultry hip-hop beats [...] A definitive musical maturation is pretty obvious from her previous material, and Morgan stays sassy with upbeat songs about adoration and the lovelorn [...] Dance with Me is sheer, decent, and carefree in the sense that Debelah Morgan made a solid record with the idea of doing it only for herself."

Track listing

Note: The version of this album on digital retailers does not include "Fall in Love Again" or "Don't Get Me Started", despite "Fall in Love Again" being on all existing physical editions of the album.

Charts

References

2000 albums
Atlantic Records albums
Debelah Morgan albums